Milan Jurík (born February 28, 1988) is a Slovak professional ice hockey player who is currently playing for Scorpions de Mulhouse in the Ligue Magnus.

External links

1988 births
Living people
HC '05 Banská Bystrica players
HC 07 Detva players
HKM Zvolen players
Sportspeople from Zvolen
Prince Albert Raiders players
Scorpions de Mulhouse players
Slovak ice hockey forwards
Czech expatriate ice hockey players in Canada
Slovak expatriate sportspeople in France
Slovak expatriate sportspeople in Belgium
Expatriate ice hockey players in France
Expatriate ice hockey players in Belgium